Michael Murphy (28 April 1934 – 10 September 2015) was an Irish cyclist. He won the Rás Tailteann in 1958.

Early life
Murphy was a native of Cahirsiveen. He left school at 11 and worked variously as a farm labourer, a quarryman and a turf-cutter.

Career
Murphy was nicknamed the Iron Man.

In 1958 he won the Rás Tailteann, winning seven of the eight stages. He won two stages in 1959 and was third in 1960.

Murphy was known for his eccentricity, and was the subject of several works: an RTÉ radio documentary, A Convict of the Road; a documentary short made for the Killorglin Archive Society called The Marvels of Mick Murphy; a play based on his life by Roddy McDevitt, and a character based on him in Jane Urquhart's novel The Night Stages. He trained by sleeping in hay barns, eating raw meat and drinking cow's blood, doing the last in imitation of the Maasai. He could also walk long distances uphill on his hands.

Personal and later life
During his life, he was a cyclist, wrestler, boxer, runner, farmer, circus performer, fire eater, ventriloquist and bricklayer. He lived in England in the 1960s, competing as a wrestler. He later worked as a builder in Germany before a fall from scaffolding left him injured. Murphy came home to Cahirsiveen, living a frugal life on his parents'  farm, without running water or windows.

Murphy never married and had no children. He was robbed in his home in 2012. He died in 2015.

References

Irish male cyclists
1934 births
2015 deaths
Rás Tailteann winners
Sportspeople from County Kerry